Alex Ambrose (born 31 May 1978) is a Danish singer, songwriter and actor. As a soloist, he is better known by his first name Alex.

Alex Ambrose was born in Brøndbyøster, Brøndby Municipality (a suburb of Copenhagen) and grew up in a musical family. He was working as a teaching assistant when he took part in the talent contest Popstars on TV 2 in 2002. But he left the competition prematurely because he did not want to go in the same musical direction as it was expected of the winner.

In summer 2005 he became part of the group J.A.Z. (consisting of Alex Ambrose and his siblings, Marc Johnson and Johnson's sister Zindy Laursen) single "Ingen gør som vi gør". He sang the theme song for the Danish reality series Paradise Hotel in 2005 and aired on TV 3 and he took part in producing and singing in the song "Hvad nu hvis" (What if in English) as charity for UNICEF, along with Nik & Jay.

With the release of the album Ta' det tilbage, Alex changed from singing in English to singing in Danish. In 2008 he released "Din dag" through independent record label 13Beats.

Discography

Albums 
2003: Thirteen
2006: Ta' det tilbage

Singles 
2003: "Them girls"
2003: "Hola"
2003: "So Beautiful"
2005: "Ingen gør som vi gør" (with J.A.Z.)
2005: "Paradise" (from reality show Paradise Hotel)
2005: "Os to"
2006: "Lever for dig (feat. Wendy Wonder & Ras Money)
2006: "Ta' det tilbage"
2006: "Jeg ser dig" (feat. Johnson)
2007: "Hvad nu hvis" (feat. Nik & Jay) - charity single for Unicef
2008: "Din dag" (feat. Søvnig)
2013: "Vi flyver"

Guest appearances in albums
2004: Årgang 79 - Niarn
2005: Mit første album - Gettic
2005: Gigolo Jesus - Jokeren
2005: Min tid - Mortito
2005: Release - Natasja
2005: Forklædt som voksen - Troo.L.S & Orgi-E 
2006: Ingen som os - UFO Yepha
2006: Det passer - Johnson
2007: Første kapitel - NEMO

References

External links
Alex Ambrose page on Discogs

1978 births
Living people
People from Brøndby Municipality
21st-century Danish male singers